Siccar Point is a rocky promontory in the county of Berwickshire on the east coast of Scotland. 
It is famous in the history of geology  for Hutton's Unconformity found in 1788, which James Hutton regarded as conclusive proof of his uniformitarian theory of geological development.

History

Siccar Point was the site of a dun, or small hill fort, in the territory of the ancient Britons.

Siccar Point is now in the parish of Cockburnspath but was formerly in the parish of Old Cambus, from which the ancient parish church of St Helen's Chapel survives as a ruin about one kilometre to the west of the point. The church is built in a Romanesque style, in a mixture of Old Red Sandstone believed to have been quarried from the nearby Greenheugh Bay and of the greywacke rock also used in the drystone dyke forming the field boundaries. It is likely that the medieval village of Old Cambus was nearer to Siccar Point than the extant hamlet of Old Cambus.

To the south of the point twentieth-century quarrying for greywacke to be used as roadstone left a hollow named Old Cambus Quarry which is now occupied by a vegetable distribution warehouse complex.

Hutton's Unconformity

Siccar Point is notable in the history of geology as a result of a boat trip in 1788 in which geologist James Hutton observed the angular unconformity of the point.
He wrote later that the evidence of the rocks provided conclusive proof of the uniformitarian theory of geological development; that is, that the natural laws and processes which operate in the universe have never changed and apply everywhere. In respect of its great importance to the development of geoscience, this locality was included by the International Union of Geological Sciences (IUGS) as the first of 100 'geological heritage sites' around the world in a listing published in October 2022.

See also
List of places in the Scottish Borders
List of places in Scotland

References

External links

James Hutton's account of his visit to Siccar Point in Berwickshire
John Playfair's historic remarks upon seeing Siccar Point, in vol. V, pt. III, 1805, Transactions of the Royal Society of Edinburgh.
Research Casting International hung on scaffolding off the cliffs at Siccar Point, painting a large section of the rocks with thick liquid latex (photo) to fabricate an exhibit for the Gottesman Hall of Planet Earth, American Museum of Natural History.

VFE: Siccar Point, Scotland — virtual excursion in Historical Geology (A free online textbook for Historical Geology courses)

Sites of Special Scientific Interest in Berwickshire and Roxburgh
Geology of Scotland
Historical geology
Protected areas in the Scottish Borders
Landforms of the Scottish Borders
Headlands of Scotland
First 100 IUGS Geological Heritage Sites